Zakarias Martin Toftezen (September 17, 1821 – August 13, 1901) was an early pioneer in the Oregon Territory. He settled within an area which later became part of the State of Washington.

Toftezen was from Levanger in Nord-Trøndelag, Norway. In late 1849, he first arrived on Whidbey Island.  He filed his land claim in 1851, taking 320 acres in what is now Oak Harbor. He was joined by his mother Emmerence (1792–1871) and sister Bernhardine  (1822–1906).  His brother Ole Christian Toftezen (1816–1884) and family arrived in the area during 1874.

Toftezen died in 1901 and was buried at the Our Saviour's Lutheran Church Cemetery in Stanwood, Washington. A monument was erected by the Pioneer Historical Society of the Stillaguamish Valley and the Sons of Norway of America on May 27, 1939.

References

External links
Zakarius Martin Taftezen Collection (Pacific Lutheran University)

1821 births
1901 deaths
Oregon pioneers
People from Levanger
People from Oak Harbor, Washington
Norwegian emigrants to the United States
American Lutherans
People from Stanwood, Washington
19th-century Lutherans